The House of Jülich, German: Haus von Jülich, was a noble House in Germany, operating from the 12th to the 16th century. Its members were initially counts of Jülich, then promoted to dukes of Jülich. By marriage they acquired the duchy of Gelders, which eventually passed to the House of Egmond. They again acquired the counties of Berg & Ravensberg by marriage, and as counts of Berg were elevated to the dukes of Berg; the House became extinct when in 1511 the last male member died and in 1543 the last female died.

History 
The members of the House were counts of Jülich, until Wiliam V supported Emperor Charles IV, who in turn rewarded William V by elevating him as duke of Jülich. William V had two sons, William II and Gerhard VI.

William II duke of Jülich married to Maria, daughter and successor of duke of Guelders (nederlands: Gerle, deutsch: Gueldern), thus he became jure auxoris duke of Guelders. He had three children, William, Reinald IV and Johanna. Both his sons died childless, so the duchy of Guelders passed to Johanna's grandson Arnold of the House of Egmond.

Gerhard VI married to Margaret of Ravensberg and Berg, who had inherit the county of Ravensberg from her father and the county of Berg from her mother. Thus Gerhard VI became jure auxoris count of Berg and Ravensberg. His son William VII count of Berg elevated from Emperor Wenceslaus to duke of Berg. The grandson of William VII, Gerhard VII, inherit the doucy of Jülich from Reinhard IV and the duchy of Berg from his uncle Adolf. His son William IV was duke of Jülich-Berg, but had no sons, thus succeeded by his daughter Maria with her husband John III duke of Cleves, of the House of La Mark.

Family tree of the House of Jülich

Sources 

 Walther Möller, Stammtafeln westdeutscher Adelsgeschlechter im Mittelalter (Darmstadt, 1922, reprint Verlag Degener & Co., 1995), Vol. 1, page 14.
 Severin Corsten: Der Überfall Heinsberger Kriegsknechte auf das Münster in Aachen (1428), in: Heimatkalender des Kreises Heinsberg 2011. Published by the county of Heinsberg, Heinsberg 2011, ISBN 978-3-925620-32-4, p. 27 ff.

External links 

 Charles Cawley's Medieval Lands, "Lower Rhine Nobility", Limburg. Archived from the original on 2011-07-04.

Jülich